Sonatane Tu'akinamolahi Taumopeau Tupou, Lord Taumoepeau-Tupou of Toula and Kotu (born 14 March 1943, in Nukuʻalofa, died 13 August 2013) was a diplomat from the Kingdom of Tonga. Lord Taumoepeau-Tupou had been the foreign minister of Tonga since 24 August 2004, though his appointment was not announced until 2 September 2004. He had also been Minister of Defense since April 2005 till his death.

Taumoepeau-Tupou was Tonga's third foreign minister, after King George Tupou V (at that time: Tupoutoʻa Lavaka), and most recently Prince Ahoeitu Unuakiotonga Tukuaho (at that time: Lavaka Ata Ulukālala). Taumoepeau-Tupou was a career diplomat. He had previously been Tonga's first ambassador to the United Nations after Tonga joined the United Nations in September 1999. During his tenure at the United Nations he was also accredited as Tonga's Ambassador to the United States and High Commissioner to Canada.

On 1 May 2009, he relinquished his position as a Cabinet Minister, to take up more diplomatic positions.

Early life 

Taumoepeau-Tupou was born in Nukualofa, Tonga to Samiuela Ma'afu Tupou and Lu'isa Ma'ume'afo'ou Taumoepeau. He was raised by Tevita Fa'ahivalu Taumoepeau and 'Ainise Kilinalivoni Tongilava. He attended primary school in Nukuʻalofa and Neiafu on Vava'u and continued his secondary education at Newington College, Stanmore, Sydney in 1953–1962, where he was known as Tom Tu'a. He later received his B.Sc. degree in Political Science from the University of Hawaii, under a scholarship from the East-West Center.

He married 'Amelia Latuniua Ahome'e, the youngest daughter of the Noble 'Ahome'e and Heu'ifanga Veikune. They had four children, and one of his daughters, Princess Marcella Kalaniuvalu-Fotofili (known previously as Lady Kalaniuvalu-Fotofili) married the son of Princess Mele Siu'ilikutapu Kalaniuvalu-Fotofili (eldest daughter of Sione Ngū Manumataongo and Princess Melenaite Tupoumoheofo Veikune) and Prince Kalaniuvalu-Fotofili (whom was formerly known as Lord Kalaniuvalu-Fotofili).

Career 

He joined the Tongan Civil Service in 1969 as an assistant secretary in the prime minister's office. He was commissioned as a first lieutenant in the Tonga Defence Services in 1971 and was posted to the Tonga High Commission in London as a First Secretary in 1973. In 1977 he re-joined the prime minister's office as an assistant secretary and was seconded to the Palace Office, where he was promoted to deputy secretary in 1978 and also appointed secretary to the Tongan Defence Board.

He was promoted to secretary for foreign affairs in 1979 and in 1983 he was posted as Tonga's High Commissioner to the United Kingdom and concurrently appointed as ambassador to the then European Community and the European Commission as well as to Belgium, Denmark, France, Germany, Italy, Luxembourg, the Netherlands, the then Soviet Union and the United States of America.

In 1986 he returned to the Ministry of Foreign Affairs as Secretary for Foreign Affairs. In 1999 he was appointed Ambassador Extraordinary and Plenipotentiary and Permanent Representative of Tonga to the United Nations and further appointed concurrently as Tonga's Ambassador Extraordinary and Extraordinary and Plenipotentiary to the United States and Tonga's High Commissioner to Canada before being recalled to take up his ministerial appointments.

Since his appointment as Foreign Minister Taumoepeau-Tupou was also appointed as Tonga's Acting defence minister on 22 April 2005 following the sudden death of Colonel 'Aloua Fetu'utolu Tupou. He was also appointed as the Acting Governor of Vava'u following the death of the Hon. ʻAkauʻola.

In June 2009, Taumoepeau-Tupou  became Tonga's Permanent Representative to the United Nations, a position that has concurrent accreditation as Tongan Ambassador to the United States, Chile, Cuba, Mexico, and Venezuela, and Tongan High Commissioner to Canada. He presented his credentials as Ambassador to the United States of America on 22 February 2010. He presented his credentials as High Commissioner to Canada on 19 May 2010.

On 28 March 2011, he was created a Tongan life peer by King George Tupou V with the noble title of Lord Taumoepeau-Tupou of Toula and Kotu.

Controversy
In April 2010, a 3-year Royal Land Commission investigation headed by Lord Fielakepa as chairman investigated corrupt land dealing, and implicated that Taumoepeau-Tupou had acted unethically in his role as Acting Governor of Vava'u. The final land commission report stated "that the Acting Governor Tu'a Taumoepeau has a lot of explaining to give" and recommended that Government investigate the whole background to the registration and the involvement of the then Acting Governor Tu'a Taumoepeau in these dealings.

Honours
National honours
  Order of Queen Sālote Tupou III, Grand Cross (31 July 2008).

References

External links 

 "Community Spotlight – H.E. Ambassador Tu'akinamolahi Taumoepeau Tupou", Undated, 'Anapesi Ka'ili, Planet Tonga
 "Pacific Islands will keep pressing for better labour mobility, says Tongan Foreign Minister", 4 November 2005, Pesi Fonua, Matangi Tonga Online
 [rtsp://webcast.un.org/ondemand/conferences/unhrc/upr/2nd/hrc080519pm-eng_part1.rm?start=00:11:03&end=00:13:39 Mr. Sonatane Tu'akinamolahi Taumoepeau Tupou addresses the United Nations Human Rights Council], upon the adoption of the Report on Tonga (19 May 2008)]

|-

1943 births
2013 deaths
Tongan nobles
Tongan diplomats
People from Nukuʻalofa
People educated at Newington College
Foreign ministers of Tonga
Defence Ministers of Tonga
Government ministers of Tonga
Ambassadors of Tonga to the United States
Ambassadors of Tonga to Belgium
Ambassadors of Tonga to Denmark
Ambassadors of Tonga to France
Ambassadors of Tonga to Germany
Ambassadors of Tonga to Italy
Ambassadors of Tonga to Luxembourg
Ambassadors of Tonga to the Netherlands
Ambassadors of Tonga to the Soviet Union
Ambassadors of Tonga to Chile
Ambassadors of Tonga to Cuba
Ambassadors of Tonga to Mexico
Ambassadors of Tonga to Venezuela
High Commissioners of Tonga to Canada
High Commissioners of Tonga to the United Kingdom
Permanent Representatives of Tonga to the United Nations
Knights Grand Cross of the Order of Queen Sālote Tupou III